Golden Vanity is a 1976 folk album by Martin Simpson. It was recorded and produced at Leader Sound by Bill Leader, and was originally issued by Trailer Records in the United Kingdom, catalogue number LER 2099. The sleeve includes notes by Martin Simpson and Barbara Dickson. Golden Vanity was Simpson's first album. It includes British and American songs and tunes, mostly traditional in origin. The title track is the traditional ballad "Golden Vanity".

Track listing
All tracks Traditional; arranged by Martin Simpson; except where indicated
"Beaulampkin" 
"Snowdrop" (Kirk McGhee)
"Bitter Withy" 
"Cindy" 
"Golden Vanity" 
"Soldier's Joy" 
"Pretty Polly" 
"Love Minus Zero/No Limit" (Bob Dylan)
"George Campbell" 
"Gotta Little Home To Go To" 
"Louisiana 1927" (Randy Newman)

Personnel
Martin Simpson - Banjo, guitar, vocals
with
Al Schmidt - Harmonicas 
Peter Thompson - Bass guitar

Martin Simpson albums
1976 albums